Newton Norman Minow (born January 17, 1926) is an American attorney and former Chair of the Federal Communications Commission. He is famous for his speech referring to television as a "vast wasteland". While still maintaining a law practice, Minow is currently the Honorary Consul General of Singapore in Chicago since 2001.

Minow has been active in Democratic party politics. He is an attorney in private practice concerning telecommunications law and is active in many nonprofit, civic, and educational institutions. Barack Obama named him a recipient of the Presidential Medal of Freedom for 2016.

Background and early law career
Born to a Jewish family in Milwaukee, Wisconsin in 1926, Minow served in World War II from 1944 to 1946 and attained the rank of a sergeant in the U.S. Army. He served in the China Burma India Theater with the 835th Signal Service Battalion headquartered in New Delhi, India. After the war, he received a Bachelor of Science degree in 1949 from Northwestern University and a Juris Doctor degree in 1950 from Northwestern University School of Law. It was possible in the period after the war for law students who had not completed college to be granted a bachelor's degree after a certain period of study in law school.

After graduating from law school, Minow worked for the law firm of Mayer, Brown & Platt (1950–1951 and 1953–1955) before becoming a law clerk to Chief Justice Fred M. Vinson of the U.S. Supreme Court (1951–1952). He later became assistant counsel to Illinois Governor Adlai Stevenson (1952–1953), worked for Stevenson's two presidential campaigns (1952 and 1956), and then was a partner in the law firm, Stevenson, Rifkind & Wirtz (1955–1961). Minow campaigned for President John F. Kennedy prior to the 1960 presidential election. In 1961 he was appointed by President Kennedy to be one of seven commissioners of the Federal Communications Commission (FCC) as well as its chair.

Federal Communications Commission Chair
Reportedly, Robert F. Kennedy and Minow frequently talked at length about the increasing importance of television in the lives of their children when they worked together on the presidential campaign of Adlai E. Stevenson.  Thereafter, it came as little surprise that after the election of John F. Kennedy Minow eagerly pursued the position of FCC Chair. Some observers nevertheless considered it unusual given his lack of experience with the media industry and with communication law. He served as chairman from March 2, 1961, through June 1, 1963.

Criticism and evaluation

Minow became one of the best-known and respected—if sometimes controversial—political figures of the early 1960s because of his criticism of commercial television. In a speech given to the National Association of Broadcasters convention on May 9, 1961, he was extremely critical of television broadcasters for not doing more, in Minow's view, to serve the public interest. His phrase "vast wasteland" is remembered years after the speech in which he said:

While some applauded his "vast wasteland" assault on commercial television as a welcome criticism of excessive violence and frivolity, others criticized it as an elitist, snobbish attack on programming that many viewers enjoyed as well as a government intrusion into private enterprise.   The S.S. Minnow of the 1964-67 television show Gilligan's Island was sarcastically named after him to express displeasure with his assessment of the quality of television.

In a 2011 speech at Harvard, Minow said that he could never have anticipated the impact of television. He still feels that news is the most important public service, but that television falls short in that area. "Too much deals with covering controversy, crimes, fires, and not enough with the country's great issues" he said. He also said that presidential campaigns are obsessed with the trivial. The speech came 50 years after he referred to television as a "vast wasteland" on May 9, 1961. The day after the 1961 speech, the New York Times headline read "F.C.C. Head Bids TV Men Reform 'Vast Wasteland'—Minow Charges Failure in Public Duty—Threatens to Use License Power".

Achievements at the Federal Communications Commission
Minow did foster two significant initiatives that altered the landscape of American television. The first was the All-Channel Receiver Act (ACRA) of 1961, which mandated UHF reception capability for all television receivers sold in the United States. This legislation sparked an increase in the number of television stations and helped launch nonprofit educational television stations (now PBS) throughout the country.

Minow said his greatest contribution was persuading Congress to pass legislation clearing the way for communications satellites. Minow recounts: "When I toured the space program with [John F.] Kennedy, he was surprised to see me". Minow told Kennedy that "communications satellites will be much more important than sending man into space, because they will send ideas into space. Ideas last longer than men."

During his two years in office, it was estimated that, other than the president, Minow generated more column inches of news coverage than any other federal official. He also promoted what ultimately became the International Telecommunications Satellite Consortium (Intelsat). This organization controlled satellite communications for many years.

Minow's papers from his tenure at the FCC are archived at the Wisconsin Center for Film and Theater Research, an organization co-sponsored by the University of Wisconsin-Madison and the Wisconsin Historical Society.

Quote from a speech to the Association of American Law Schools:

After 35 years, I have finished a comprehensive study of European comparative law. In Germany, under the law, everything is prohibited, except that which is permitted. In France, under the law, everything is permitted, except that which is prohibited. In the Soviet Union, under the law, everything is prohibited, including that which is permitted. And in Italy, under the law, everything is permitted, especially that which is prohibited.

Subsequent communications work
He has been on the Board of Governors of the Public Broadcasting Service and its predecessor, National Educational Television serving from 1973–1980 and serving as its chair from 1978 to 1980. He is a recent past-president of the Carnegie Corporation, a PBS sponsor, and the original funder of Sesame Street.

He is the Walter Annenberg professor emeritus at Northwestern University, as well as the author of four books and numerous professional journal and magazine articles. Minow has supported and written about the Digital Promise Project, a project to fulfill the educational potential of the internet.

Sidley Austin LLP
He is senior counsel in the Chicago-headquartered law firm of Sidley Austin LLP, a large international law firm with multiple areas of expertise, including telecommunications-related law. Between 1965 and 1991, he was a managing partner in the firm before becoming senior counsel in 1991.

Honorary Consul General of the Republic of Singapore 
Minow's early contact with Singapore and Singaporean officials was through his law work at Sidley Austin, which opened a Singapore office in 1982. Even when he was FCC Chair, he worried about the increasing export of Hollywood programming overseas and the impact it would have on perceptions of the United States among citizens in other countries.

He was appointed Honorary Consul General in 2001. His office processes consular and visa applications.

Contemporary politics 
Minow was a prominent supporter of Barack Obama's candidacy for President of the United States. Minow recruited Obama in 1988 to work for his law firm Sidley Austin LLP as a summer associate, where Obama met his future wife Michelle Robinson. Minow pursued Obama on the recommendation of his daughter Martha, who was Obama's law professor.

According to Michelle Obama's book Becoming, Minow and his wife "busted" then Michelle Robinson and Barack Obama - both still associates at Sidley Austin - on their first date, greeting them "warmly" in the popcorn line at the Water Tower Place cinema, before the new couple saw Spike Lee's movie, Do The Right Thing. Robinson and Obama had wanted to keep their relationship a secret from colleagues at the firm; Minow only "smiled" and "made no comment" at the fact they were together.

Awards and corporate work 
Minow has sat on the Board of Directors at Foote, Cone & Belding Communications Inc.; Tribune Co.; Manpower, Inc.; AON Corp.; CBS, and Sara Lee Corporation. He has been Chairman of the Board at RAND Corporation. He was trustee of the Chicago Orchestral Association as well as with the Mayo Foundation, which operates Mayo Clinic. He is a life trustee of Northwestern University and the University of Notre Dame, where he was the first Jewish member of the board, and he is currently Chairman of the Board of the World Health Imaging, Telemedicine and Informatics Alliance. He co-chaired the 1976 and 1980 presidential debates and is a vice-chair of the Commission on Presidential Debates. He has served on numerous presidential commissions and was chair of a special advisory committee to the Secretary of Defense on protecting civil liberties in the fight against terrorism. His book on the history of the presidential debates was released in 2008.

Minow is the recipient of 12 honorary degrees. He was a recipient of the Peabody Award in 1961 and the Woodrow Wilson Award for public service. He was also a member of the Peabody Awards Board of Jurors from 1963 to 1976.

Minow was inducted as a Laureate of The Lincoln Academy of Illinois and awarded the Order of Lincoln (the State's highest honor) by the Governor of Illinois in 2014 in the area of Government & Law.

Between 2015 and 2018, Newton Minow served as a member of the Executive Advisory Council of the American Archive of Public Broadcasting (AAPB), after which, his daughter Mary Minow joined the Council. In 2020, the AAPB launched the 'Broadcasting in the Public Interest: The Newton Minow Collection' to honor Minow's role in developing noncommercial television. The collection includes interviews, panels, testimonies, events, and profiles featuring him between 1961 to 2016.

He received the Presidential Medal of Freedom from President Barack Obama on November 22, 2016.

Personal life
He and his wife, Josephine Baskin Minow, have three daughters, all trained as lawyers; Nell Minow, shareholder activist and movie critic; Martha L. Minow, former dean of Harvard Law School; and Mary, a library law expert appointed to the Obama administration.
Martha Minnow authored a book published  in 2021: "Saving the News: Why the Constitution Calls for Government Action to Preserve
Freedom of Speech," published by Oxford University Press.

He is great-uncle to Adam Frankel, a speechwriter of his former protege, Barack Obama. Josephine Minow's older sister, Irene, is Frankel's paternal grandmother.

Books
Abandoned in the Wasteland: Children, Television, and the First Amendment 
Presidential Television 
For Great Debates: A New Plan for Future Presidential TV Debates 
A Digital Gift for the Nation (with Larry Grossman) 
Equal Time: The Private Broadcaster and the Public Interest ASIN B0007DZB86
Inside the Presidential Debates: Their Improbable Past and Promising Future (co-authored by Craig L. LaMay)

See also 
 List of law clerks of the Supreme Court of the United States (Chief Justice)

References

External links

 Broadcasting in the Public Interest: The Newton Minow Collection in the American Archive of Public Broadcasting
 Complete text and audio of the "Vast Wasteland" speech from AmericanRhetoric.com
 
 American Lawyer "Lifetime Achievement" Award
 An excerpt from Inside the Presidential Debates: Their Improbable Past and Promising Future
 Newton N. Minow Papers at the Wisconsin Center for Film and Theater Research
 
 
 Image of Thurgood Marshall, Hyman Rickover and Newton Minow at convocation "Prospects for Democracy" at Beverly Hilton, California, 1963. Los Angeles Times Photographic Archive (Collection 1429). UCLA Library Special Collections, Charles E. Young Research Library, University of California, Los Angeles.

Law clerks of the Supreme Court of the United States
Illinois lawyers
Chairmen of the Federal Communications Commission
Illinois Democrats
Wisconsin Democrats
1926 births
Living people
Northwestern University Pritzker School of Law alumni
Northwestern University faculty
Lawyers from Chicago
Singaporean diplomats
Lawyers from Milwaukee
United States Army non-commissioned officers
United States Army personnel of World War II
Military personnel from Milwaukee
PBS people
20th-century American Jews
Writers from Chicago
Writers from Milwaukee
20th-century American lawyers
21st-century American lawyers
Presidential Medal of Freedom recipients
People associated with Sidley Austin
Kennedy administration personnel
21st-century American Jews